The 2022 Asian Le Mans Series was the tenth season of the Automobile Club de l'Ouest's Asian Le Mans Series. It is the fourth 24 Hours of Le Mans-based series created by the ACO, following the American Le Mans Series (since merged with the Rolex Sports Car Series to form the United SportsCar Championship), the European Le Mans Series and the FIA World Endurance Championship. The four-event season began at the Dubai Autodrome in Dubai on 11 February 2022 and ended at the Yas Marina Circuit in Abu Dhabi on 20 February 2022.

Calendar
The calendar for the 2022 season was announced on the official website 23 July 2021.

This Asian Le Mans Series season was once again run, in its entirety in the Middle East, in the United Arab Emirates at the Dubai Autodrome in Dubai and Yas Marina Circuit in Abu Dhabi in February 2022.

This season continued to comprise four four-hour length races. The races were run on the two circuits and combined night, day and twilight racing.

Entry list

LMP2

LMP3

Results
Bold indicates overall winner.

Teams Championships
Points are awarded according to the following structure:

LMP2 Teams Championship

LMP2 Am Teams Championship

LMP3 Teams Championship

GT Teams Championship

GT Am Teams Championship

Driver's championships
Points are awarded according to the following structure:

LMP2 Drivers Championship

LMP2 Am Drivers Championship

LMP3 Drivers Championship

GT Drivers Championship

GT Am Drivers Championship

Notes

References

External links
 

Asian Le Mans Series seasons
Asian Le Mans Series
Asian Le Mans Series
Asian Le Mans
Asian Le Mans Series